Pierre Giguère is a Canadian politician in Quebec, who was elected to the National Assembly of Quebec in the 2014 election. He represents the electoral district of Saint-Maurice as a member of the Quebec Liberal Party.

Prior to his election to the legislature, he was a city councillor in Shawinigan. He ran in the 2012 election as a candidate of the Coalition Avenir Québec, but rejoined the Liberals in February 2014.

References

Quebec Liberal Party MNAs
Living people
French Quebecers
Quebec municipal councillors
People from Shawinigan
21st-century Canadian politicians
Year of birth missing (living people)